Vlădoiu may refer to:

Ion Vlădoiu (born 1968), Romanian footballer and manager
Valea Vlădoiu River, river in Romania